Saint Finan may refer to:

Finan of Lindisfarne  (died 661), second Bishop of Lindisfarne from 651 until 661
Finan Cam (or Fionan, Finian), Abbot of Kinnity, an early Irish saint